West House or Westhouse may refer to:

in France
Westhouse, a commune in the Bas-Rhin department in Alsace in north-eastern France

in the United Kingdom
West House (Chelsea), Grade II* listed house in London
The West House, family restaurant in Biddenden, Kent

in the United States (by state)
West House (Helena, Arkansas), listed on the National Register of Historic Places (NRHP) in Arkansas
West House (Wellington, Ohio), listed on the NRHP in Lorain County